Ferreirana dejeani is a species of leaf beetle of Senegal, described by Édouard Lefèvre in 1877.

References

Eumolpinae
Beetles of Africa
Beetles described in 1877
Insects of West Africa
Taxa named by Édouard Lefèvre